Gaius Julius Bassus was a Roman senator, who was active during the reign of Antoninus Pius. He was suffect consul in the nundinium of November-December 139 as the colleague of Marcus Ceccius Justinus. He was the son of Gaius Julius Quadratus Bassus, consul in 105. The Julii Bassi were a prominent family of Pergamum, that had descended from the Attalid dynasty and Galatian tetrarchs.

Julius Bassus may be identical with one Bassus who was active in the second century; Lucan describes him as an effeminate sophist; the Palatine Anthology preserves a poem by one "Bassus of Smyrna", who need not have been born in that city; Galen dedicated his De libris propriis to one Bassus.

Knowledge of the career of Julius Bassus is limited to one appointment, as governor of the imperial province of Dacia Superior; Werner Eck dates his tenure from late 135 (an inscription attests to his governorship on 13 December 135) to 138.

References 

2nd-century Romans
Suffect consuls of Imperial Rome
Roman governors of Dacia
Bassus, Julius Gaius